Woozy may refer to:

 Woozy (Oz), a fictional creature in the children's novel The Patchwork Girl of Oz 
 Woozy Winks, the sidekick of fictional superhero Plastic Man
 "Woozy", a track by Faithless used in the soundtrack to The Beach
 Woozy (artist), a Greek street artist
 Woozy, a rock band from New Orleans

See also
 Wu Zi Mu, a character in the video game Grand Theft Auto: San Andreas
 Woosie, nickname of golfer Ian Woosnam